Conus algoensis, common name the algoa cone, is a species of sea snail, a marine gastropod mollusk in the family Conidae, the cone snails and their allies.

Like all species within the genus Conus, these snails are predatory and venomous. They are capable of "stinging" humans, therefore live ones should be handled carefully or not at all.

There are four subspecies :
Conus algoensis algoensis Sowerby, G.B. I, 1834 (synonym: Conus algoensis agulhasi Coomans, Moolenbeek & Wils, 1980)
 Conus algoensis norpothi Lorenz, 2015 (alternate representation: Conus (Sciteconus) algoensis norpothi Lorenz, 2015)
 Conus algoensis scitulus Reeve, 1849 (synonym: Conus scitulus Reeve, 1849)
Conus algoensis simplex Sowerby, G.B. II, 1857 (synonym: Conus simplex G. B. Sowerby II, 1858 )

Description
The size of the shell varies between 12 mm and 60 mm. The thin shell is smooth,. It has a chestnut-brown color, with one or two bands of longitudinal white markings. The spire is articulated with white and brown.

Distribution
This marine species occurs off the south coast of South Africa.

References

 Puillandre N., Duda T.F., Meyer C., Olivera B.M. & Bouchet P. (2015). One, four or 100 genera? A new classification of the cone snails. Journal of Molluscan Studies. 81: 1–23

Gallery

External links
 The Conus Biodiversity website
 Cone Shells – Knights of the Sea
  Branch, G.M. et al. (2002). Two Oceans. 5th impression. David Philip, Cate Town & Johannesburg
 

algoensis
Gastropods described in 1834